Lake Duluti is a volcanic crater lake in the Arusha region of Tanzania, on the eastern edge of the eastern branch of the Great Rift Valley.

A road from the Arusha-Moshi road leads to a restaurant on the Northern shore of the lake, where canoes can be hired.

References

Geography of Arusha Region
Duluti